Hero Hesman is a Vietnamese science-fiction comic series created by artist Nguyễn Hùng Lân from 1992 to 1996. The series consists of 159 volumes with 72 pages each volume, and was published by Hanoi Fine Arts Publishing House.

History
Hesman originally is an adaptation of Voltron, a Japanese-American cartoon television series with first 4 volumes based on that cartoon. Hesman name is derived from "He's man" (He is a man, not a robot). The next 155 volumes of the series are Hùng Lân's own composition with many events and tens of characters were created. Along the storyline, Hùng Lân added many elements of the real robot genre such as energy sources for Hesman to function or upgrades that alter Hesman's appearance substantially and his status as a cognitive robot. If Voltron is merely a machine, Hesman grew out of this archetype and has been given a personality, which can be described as serious but occasionally displays cunning and a sense of humor. On the other hand, fantastical elements such as magic, wizards and ghosts were also recurrent.

Hesman details an adventure of an intelligent and partially autonomous robot and its human companions. Throughout the series, Hesman and the team travel the Galaxy, fight against various antagonists to defend the universe's peace.

List of volumes

 Tập 1: CUỘC VƯỢT NGỤC 
 Tập 2: HESMAN XUẤT HIỆN 
 Tập 3: MÃNG XÀ GIẢ DẠNG
 Tập 4: LỌ NƯỚC THẦN
 Tập 5: DŨNG SĨ CỤT TAY
 Tập 6: MƯU KẾ PHÙ THỦY 
 Tập 7: HÀNH TINH CHẾT 
 Tập 8: THU PHỤC NGƯỜI THÚ
 Tập 9: KẺ HỦY DIỆT
 Tập 10: NGUỒN ĐIỆN CHẾT
 Tập 11: GIỐNG NGƯỜI KINH DỊ
 Tập 12: NHỮNG KẺ GIẢ DẠNG 
 Tập 13: NGƯỜI HÙNG KHÔNG GIAN
 Tập 14: NỮ QUÁI YANDA
 Tập 15: CHÚA TỂ VŨ TRỤ
 Tập 16: CHIẾN CÔNG CỦA GASKO
 Tập 17: TỘI PHẠM VŨ TRỤ 
 Tập 18: BÍ MẬT HÀNH TINH CHẾT 
 Tập 19: GIÁN ĐIỆP ROBOT 
 Tập 20: BÍ ẨN NGOÀI VŨ TRỤ 
 Tập 21: NGƯỜI MÁY PHẢN LOẠN 
 Tập 22: BÁU VẬT CỦA ARUS 
 Tập 23: TRUY TÌM TỘI PHẠM 
 Tập 24: THANH GƯƠM THẦN 
 Tập 25: ĐÒN TRỪNG PHẠT 
 Tập 26: PHÙ THỦY ARMIT
 Tập 27: VŨ KHÍ BÍ MẬT 
 Tập 28: CUỘC DU HÀNH NGƯỢC THỜI GIAN
 Tập 29: THẦN CHẾT 
 Tập 30: NGƯỜI HÙNG LÂM NẠN 
 Tập 31: BÃO TÁP VŨ TRỤ 
 Tập 32: NGƯỜI ĐÁ 
 Tập 33: TRÁI TIM ROBOT 
 Tập 34: GIỜ HÀNH QUYẾT 
 Tập 35: LẠC NGOÀI KHÔNG GIAN 
 Tập 36: NỮ HOÀNG BÃO TỐ 
 Tập 37: KẺ PHẢN BỘI 
 Tập 38: TIA CHỚP XANH 
 Tập 39: CUỘC CHIẾN KINH HOÀNG 
 Tập 40: SA LƯỚI TỬ THẦN 
 Tập 41: THIÊN THỂ KỲ LẠ 
 Tập 42: NGƯỜI ĐỘT BIẾN 
 Tập 43: BÓNG MA TRÊN HÀNH TINH 
 Tập 44: DIỆT THẦN SẤM 
 Tập 45: VẠCH MẶT KẺ THÙ 
 Tập 46: CUỘC CHẠM TRÁN BẤT NGỜ 
 Tập 47: HÀNH TINH NHÂN TẠO 
 Tập 48: NGƯỜI NỮ ANH HÙNG 
 Tập 49: NHỮNG KẺ SĂN NGƯỜI 
 Tập 50: NHỆN TINH TRẢ THÙ 
 Tập 51: KẺ CHIẾN BẠI 
 Tập 52: THUNG LŨNG TỬ THẦN 
 Tập 53: BÁC HỌC ĐIÊN 
 Tập 54: CẢNH SÁT KHÔNG GIAN 
 Tập 55: ỐC ĐẢO VŨ TRỤ 
 Tập 56: THẤU KÍNH KỲ DIỆU 
 Tập 57: TỬ THẦN MUÔN MẶT 
 Tập 58: MẶT TRỜI ĐEN 
 Tập 59: ROBOT TÁI SINH 
 Tập 60: CHIẾC ÁO GIÁP CỨU NẠN 
 Tập 61: TIA SÁNG CHẾT NGƯỜI 
 Tập 62: VÙNG ĐẤT BÍ HIỂM 
 Tập 63: BÓNG ĐÊM KINH HOÀNG 
 Tập 64: ÂM MƯU NHAM HIỂM 
 Tập 65: THIÊN SỨ CHẾT 
 Tập 66: CHUYẾN BAY BÃO TÁP 
 Tập 67: SỨC MẠNH VÔ HÌNH 
 Tập 68: LƯỠI KIẾM THẦN BÍ 
 Tập 69: ĐỌ SỨC VỚI TỬ THẦN 
 Tập 70: LÃNH CHÚA OMANS 
 Tập 71: BÀN TAY THÉP 
 Tập 72: QUYỀN LỰC BÓNG TỐI 
 Tập 73: BÃO LỬA TRÊN THIÊN HÀ 
 Tập 74: KẺ THÙ GIẤU MẶT 
 Tập 75: HIỆP SĨ VŨ TRỤ
 Tập 76: SA MẠC TỬ THẦN 
 Tập 77: BẠO CHÚA VŨ TRỤ 
 Tập 78: NỮ THẦN KIM TINH 
 Tập 79: CHIẾN BINH VŨ TRỤ 
 Tập 80: CÚ ĐẤM SẤM SÉT 
 Tập 81: THANH GƯƠM CÔNG LÝ 
 Tập 82: THIÊN THẦN GÃY CÁNH 
 Tập 83: BÀN TAY MA THUẬT 
 Tập 84: LẠC VÀO TƯƠNG LAI 
 Tập 85: ROBOT BIẾN HÌNH 
 Tập 86: VIÊN KIM CƯƠNG THẦN BÍ 
 Tập 87: CẠM BẪY CHẾT NGƯỜI 
 Tập 88: KHO TÀNG BÍ MẬT 
 Tập 89: SIÊU NHÂN ARUS 
 Tập 90: MỘC TINH HUYỀN BÍ 
 Tập 91: ĐÙA VỚI TỬ THẦN 
 Tập 92: CHIẾN CÔNG PHI THƯỜNG 
 Tập 93: LÂU ĐÀI MA QUÁI 
 Tập 94: ĐỐI MẶT VỚI THẦN CHẾT 
 Tập 95: CÁNH TAY TIN CẬY 
 Tập 96: KING KONG THỨC DẬY
 Tập 97: VƯỢT QUA GIÔNG TỐ 
 Tập 98: ĐỘI BIỆT ĐỘNG KHÔNG GIAN 
 Tập 99: SIÊU NHÂN MẮC NẠN 
 Tập 100: THAY HÌNH ĐỔI DẠNG 
 Tập 101: ĐỘI BAY CẢM TỬ 
 Tập 102: LƯỠI GƯƠM ĐỊNH MỆNH 
 Tập 103: ANH HÙNG HỘI NGỘ 
 Tập 104: SÓNG THẦN VŨ TRỤ 
 Tập 105: TRUY TÌM KHO BÁU
 Tập 106: NHỮNG KẺ CỨU NẠN 
 Tập 107: MỘT CUỘC THÁCH ĐẤU 
 Tập 108: BẠO LOẠN GIỮA THIÊN HÀ 
 Tập 109: KẺ THÙ VÔ HÌNH
 Tập 110: BỘ ÓC SIÊU PHÀM
 Tập 111: TẤM GƯƠNG DŨNG CẢM
 Tập 112: THOÁT HIỂM
 Tập 113: TRẬN ĐẤU QUYẾT TỬ 
 Tập 114: NGƯỜI KHÁCH BÍ HIỂM 
 Tập 115: NỖI KINH HOÀNG Ở HASLEY 
 Tập 116: SỨC MẠNH VẠN NĂNG
 Tập 117: CUỘC SĂN ĐUỔI QUYẾT LIỆT
 Tập 118: BAY VỀ QUÁ KHỨ 
 Tập 119: VƯƠNG QUỐC QUÁI DỊ 
 Tập 120: CÚ ĐẤM QUYẾT ĐỊNH 
 Tập 121: CHẠY TRỐN TỬ THẦN 
 Tập 122: ANH HÙNG VÔ DANH 
 Tập 123: THIÊN HÀ BÍ ẨN 
 Tập 124: NÚI ĐÁ TIÊN TRI 
 Tập 125: ÁNH SÁNG QUYỀN LỰC 
 Tập 126: ANH HÙNG BẤT ĐẮC DĨ 
 Tập 127: BÃO CÁT SA MẠC 
 Tập 128: LUỒNG SÉT VÔ HÌNH 
 Tập 129: ĐÔI MẮT KỲ DIỆU
 Tập 130: BIỂN CHẾT 
 Tập 131: THÁM TỬ KHÔNG GIAN
 Tập 132: ĐÒN SẤM SÉT
 Tập 133: CHIẾN BINH THÉP 
 Tập 134: BÁC HỌC QUÁI DỊ 
 Tập 135: BÃO LỬA KINH HOÀNG 
 Tập 136: MẶT NẠ MUÔN HÌNH 
 Tập 137: MŨI TÊN THẦN 
 Tập 138: NGƯỜI HAI MẶT 
 Tập 139: SỨC LỰC THẦN BÍ 
 Tập 140: MÁY TÍNH KỲ DIỆU 
 Tập 141: KHO TÀNG DƯỚI ĐÁY BIỂN 
 Tập 142: VỤ MẤT TÍCH BÍ ẨN 
 Tập 143: CƠN BÃO CHẾT NGƯỜI 
 Tập 144: SỰ HI SINH CAO CẢ 
 Tập 145: DÒNG MÁU THÉP 
 Tập 146: ĐÁM MÂY BÍ HIỂM 
 Tập 147: TÊN SÁT NHÂN GIẤU MẶT 
 Tập 148: BIỆT ĐỘI KHỦNG BỐ 
 Tập 149: QUÁI NHÂN BẤT TRỊ 
 Tập 150: VỤ MƯU SÁT KHÔNG THÀNH 
 Tập 151: NGƯỜI NGUYÊN TỬ 
 Tập 152: CHIẾC ÁO ĐIỆN QUANG 
 Tập 153: PHIÊU LƯU TRONG LÒNG ĐẤT 
 Tập 154: XÔNG VÀO GIÔNG BÃO 
 Tập 155: CƠN GIẬN CỦA THẦN NÚI
 Tập 156: SA LẦY Ở BETA 
 Tập 157: HIỆP SĨ BẠCH KIM 
 Tập 158: VÒNG VÂY TỘI ÁC 
 Tập 159: GÃ KHỔNG LỒ VUI TÍNH

See Also
 Vietnamese superman

References

 Tốp 10 bộ truyện tranh gắn liền tuổi thơ 8X
 Trò truyện cùng cha đẻ Hesman
 Dũng sĩ Hesman và những giá trị bất diệt tại Việt Nam
 Tâm sự về huyền thoại dũng sĩ Hesman của tác giả Hùng Lân
 5 giá trị giúp dũng sĩ Hesman trở thành huyền thoại
Viet comics
1992 establishments in Vietnam
1992 comics debuts